Gayton may refer to:

Places
 Gayton, Merseyside
 Gayton, Norfolk
 Gayton, Northamptonshire
 Gayton, Staffordshire
 Gayton Engine, Lincolnshire
 Gayton le Marsh, Lincolnshire
 Gayton le Wold, Lincolnshire
 Gayton Thorpe, Norfolk

Other
 Gayton (surname)
 Gayton Hall, Herefordhire
 Gayton House, one of the Houses of Harrow School
 Gayton Windmill (disambiguation)